Kim Ji-seok (born 13 June 1989) is a Korean professional Go player.

An Younggil describes Jiseok's style as very aggressive.

Promotion record

Career record
2006: 44 wins, 26 losses
2007: 78 wins, 31 losses
2008: 37 wins, 24 losses
2009: 71 wins, 20 losses
2010: 47 wins, 22 losses
2011: 21 wins, 8 losses

Titles and runners-up

Korean Baduk League

References

External links
Kim Ji-seok's profile at Korea Baduk Association

1989 births
Living people
South Korean Go players